Ministry of Mines may refer to:

 Ministry of Mines (India)
 Ministry of Mines (Myanmar)
 Ministry of Mines and Minerals Development, Zambia
 Ministry of Mines and Mining Development (Zimbabwe)